The 2018-2022 Toronto City Council consists of councillors elected in the 2018 municipal election. The current council term began on December 4, 2018.

In 2018, the Mayor's salary was $192,503 and Councillors was $114,306.

Leadership
The Mayor of Toronto for this term (2018-2022) is John Tory.

City  council

Executive committee
Current members of the Committee:

Paul Ainslie
Ana Bailão
Gary Crawford
Denzil Minnan-Wong
Frances Nunziata
James Pasternak
Michael Thompson
John Tory (Chair)

References

Municipal government of Toronto
2018 establishments in Ontario
2010s in Toronto